The funeral of Qasem Soleimani, an Iranian major general in the Islamic Revolutionary Guard Corps (IRGC), was held from 4 to 7 January 2020 in some cities in Iraq and Iran – including Baghdad, Karbala, Najaf, Ahvaz, Mashhad, Tehran, Qom, and his hometown Kerman. 

The funeral ceremony of Soleimani in Tehran was described as "the largest in Iran since the funeral of Grand Ayatollah Ruhollah Khomeini", founder of the Islamic Republic of Iran, in 1989.  
On 7 January 2020, a stampede took place at the burial procession in Kerman, killing at least 56 mourners and injuring over 200. Consequently, Soleimani's burial was delayed due to the massive crowds.The BBC reported that millions of mourners gathered in Soleimani funeral on 6th January.

His body was buried in his hometown of Kerman on Wednesday, 8 January, just hours after Iran attacked two US bases in Iraq in retaliation for his death.

Iraq
On 5 January, a funeral procession for Qasem Soleimani was held in Baghdad with thousands of mourners in attendance, waving militia and Iraqi flags and chanting "death to America, death to Israel". The procession started at the Al-Kadhimiya Mosque in Baghdad. Iraq's prime minister, Adil Abdul-Mahdi, and leaders of Iran-backed militias attended the funeral procession. Soleimani's remains were taken to the holy Shia cities of Karbala and Najaf.

Iran

Mashhad and Ahvaz
Iranian State TV estimated that there were millions of mourners in Mashhad and Ahvaz on 5 January. According to ABC, more than a million gathered in Ahvaz.

Tehran and Qom

CNN described the number of mourners who participated in the Tehran funeral with "a sea of people" on Monday. Iranian State TV reported estimates of millions of mourners in attendance. The mourners had Soleimani's photos in their hands, screamed "down with the USA" and "death to the USA". BBC reported millions of mourners.

Satellite imagery released by Maxar showed that gathered people stretched from "Azadi Square and for nearly 6 kilometres [3.7 miles] along Azadi Street in central Tehran" on 6 January morning. Associated Press journalists estimated "a turnout of at least 1 million" in Tehran.

Ayatollah Ali Khamenei led the funeral prayer (Salat al-Janazah) of Soleimani and other victims of the U.S. airstrike. President of Iran Hassan Rouhani and other officials took part to funeral prayer. General Ismail Qaani cried over his coffin.

Kerman

According to France24, the number of mourners attending the funeral procession in Kerman, Tehran, Qom, Mashhad, and Ahvaz were roughly the same. The BBC stated that there were widespread chants of "death to America" and "death to Trump". During Ayatollah Khomeini's 1989 funeral procession, eight people were killed in a stampede, also caused in part due to difficulty in containing the massive crowd.

Soleimani had asked prior to his death to be buried next to his wartime comrade Mohammad-Hossein Yousefollahi. He asked for a simple gravestone "similar to [his] shahid comrades" and with the inscription " Soldier Qassem Soleimani", without any honorific title.

Stampede and burial cancellation
On 7 January 2020, a stampede crush took place at the burial procession for Soleimani in Kerman, killing at least 56 mourners and injuring more than 200. Head of the burial committee Mehdi Sadafi told the state-run ISNA news agency that Soleimani's burial was cancelled after the deaths.

Reactions
Commenting on photos of the huge crowds in Tehran's funeral, Minister of Foreign Affairs of Iran Javad Zarif tweeted: "Do you still imagine you can break the will of this great nation and its people? End of malign US presence in West Asia has begun."

Anniversary 

There have been held commemoration ceremonies by the name of "Commemoration-Ceremony (Anniversary) of Martyr Qassem-Soleimani" (and Abu Mahdi al-Muhandis) both in person and virtually (via web conferencing) in the cities of the Islamic Republic of Iran and several countries, such as Oman, Iraq, Syria and Portugal. According to Fars News Agency, the anniversary of the commemoration of Qasem Soleimani,  Abu Mahdi al-Muhandis and their colleagues was held with the presence of local and foreign officials in University of Tehran, Iran.

See also
 Thirteen revenge scenarios
 2020 in Iran
 2020 Iranian attack on U.S. forces in Iraq
 Death and state funeral of Ruhollah Khomeini
 Reactions to the 2020 Baghdad International Airport airstrike
 List of largest funerals

References

External links
 

January 2020 events in Iran
Aftermath of the assassination of Qasem Soleimani
21st century in Baghdad
21st century in Karbala
21st century in Tehran
Human stampedes in 2020
Soleimani
Human stampedes in Asia
Accidental deaths in Iran
Ahvaz
Kerman
Mashhad
Najaf
Qom
State funerals in Iran